Devika Palshikar (Devanagari: देविका पळशीकर; born 20 June 1979) is an Indian former cricketer and current cricket coach. She played as a right-handed batter and right-arm leg break bowler. She appeared in one Test match and 15 One Day Internationals for India between 2006 and 2008. She played domestic cricket for Air India and Maharashtra.

After playing, Palshikar was assistant coach of India between 2014 and 2016, and assistant coach of Bangladesh in 2018. She has also coached various Indian domestic teams, and was head coach of Velocity for the 2022 Women's T20 Challenge.

References

External links
 
 

1979 births
Living people
Marathi people
Cricketers from Maharashtra
Indian women cricketers
India women Test cricketers
India women One Day International cricketers
Air India women cricketers
Maharashtra women cricketers
West Zone women cricketers